Leopoldo Conti (12 April 1901 – 12 January 1970) was an Italian professional football player and coach, who played as a striker or winger.

Club career
At club level, Conti played for several Italian clubs, in particular Ambrosiana Inter (as they were known at the time), with whom he had two spells (1918–20; 1921–31), winning two league titles, in 1920 and 1930, and scoring a total of 76 league goals in 236 league appearances; he also served as the team's captain between 1922 and 1931. He also played for Enotria Goliardo (1917–18), Padova (1920–21), and Pro Patria (1931–33). He made his professional debut in the Italian top flight on 3 November 1929, with A. Inter, in a 3–2 home win over Cremonese.

International career
At international level, Conti obtained 31 appearances for Italy between 1920 and 1929, scoring 8 goals. Conti is either the second or third-youngest player ever to start a match for Italy, behind only Eugenio Mosso, and possibly Rodolfo Gavinelli. Conti later took part at the 1924 Summer Olympics with the Italy national football team. & was a part of the squad winning the 1927-30 Central European International Cup.

Coaching career
Following his retirement from professional football, Conti also served as a coach with Lecco from 1934–37.

Honours
Inter
 Italian Football Championship: 1919–20
 Serie A: 1929–30

International 
Italy
 Central European International Cup: 1927-30

References

External links
 
 Profile at Enciclopedia del Calcio 
 Profile at FIGC 
 Profile at Italia 1910 

1901 births
1970 deaths
Italian footballers
Association football forwards
Italy international footballers
Serie A players
Inter Milan players
Calcio Padova players
Aurora Pro Patria 1919 players
Footballers at the 1924 Summer Olympics
Olympic footballers of Italy
Italian football managers
Calcio Lecco 1912 managers
A.C. Monza managers